Johnny Dee (born John DiTeodoro, Jr., April 6, 1963) is an American heavy metal drummer.

He is best known for being a member of the glam metal band Britny Fox, and as a member of Doro Pesch's band since 1993. In the past Dee played in the bands Mariah and Waysted, as well as collaborated with artists such as Blaze Bayley and guitarist Jack Frost.

Career
John DiTeodoro jr. was born and raised in Conshohocken, Pennsylvania, a suburb of Philadelphia, where he attended Spring Mill Elementary and Plymouth-Whitemarsh Senior High, graduating at Central Montco Technical High School in Commercial Art. He is a self-taught musician, who started playing drums at the age of 12. The first influences on his drumming style came from Peter Criss (KISS) and Ian Paice (Deep Purple). His first experiences with local bands put him in contact with other young musicians of the neighborhood, like Billy Degley, later known as Billy Childs, and other future members of Britny Fox.

Johnny Dee began his career as drummer for the heavy metal band World War III in his home town Philadelphia around 1985, recording their self-titled debut in the same year. A short time later, he joined the British hard rock band Waysted, with which he recorded the album Save Your Prayers in 1986.  When Waysted disbanded, he returned to Philadelphia in 1987 to replace in the glam metal band Britny Fox the temporary drummer Adam West, who in turn had replaced the late Tony Destra. The band's first two albums, Britny Fox (1988) and Boys in Heat (1989), climbed the charts and achieved considerable success. Singer and guitarist Dean Davidson left the band in 1990 to form Blackeyed Susan and Britny Fox continued with his replacement Tommy Paris, but did not get the good results of previous years. The first album with Paris, Bite Down Hard (1991), did not find a receptive market and sold poorly.

In 1991, Dee recorded with the Minneapolis glam metal band Mariah their second album Somewhere Between Heaven and Earth, which was published in a cassette-only limited edition. The band line-up comprised D.O.A. and Waysted keyboardist Jimmy DiLella and Tim Compton, former guitarist of Lynn Allen. DiLella had been a session musician for Britny Fox, but had never played with the group before their premature disbandment in 1993. However, he was instrumental in the hiring of his friend Johnny Dee to replace drummer Chris Branco in the Doro Pesch's touring band, where he was the keyboard player. In 2005, Retrospect Records released the two albums of Mariah, the second with Johnny Dee on drums. In 2007, the same label released another album of the band titled III, featuring again Dee.

The fast commercial decline of glam metal acts in favor of grunge and alternative rock, caused the dissolution of many bands like Britny Fox, leaving their members unemployed. Dee was lucky to have found jobs as musician in Europe with Doro, who was a still a successful and charting artist in Germany, and in the US East Coast with LeCompt, a cover band formed by former Tangier vocalist Mike LeCompt which included also Billy Childs on bass. He recorded with Doro the live album Doro Live (1993) and several studio albums, remaining to this day the official drummer of the band. He also served as tour manager for Doro's US tours. In the 90s, when not engaged in European tours with Doro or with LeCompt, Dee worked with a third band that he had founded with Tommy Paris in Philadelphia, called Uncle Edna. They released a self-titled EP in 1996.

In 2000, Britny Fox reformed and went on tour with Dee on drums, releasing the live album Long Way to Live! (2001) and their fourth studio album Springhead Motorshark in 2003. During the summer of 2002, Dee played on tour also with Blaze Bayley (ex-singer of Iron Maiden and Wolfsbane), in support to the American thrash metal band Overkill on a European tour. In 2003, Dee, along with bassist Billy Childs, worked on the solo project of guitarist Jack Frost (Savatage, Metalium), releasing the album Raise Your Fist to Metal.

Dee was involved in a project to re-record classic UFO songs in 2006, along with former UFO and Waysted guitarist Paul Chapman and the former lead singer of MSG Robin McAuley.

In 2008, Britny Fox officially announced a new line-up, without Johnny Dee on drums. A new reunion was announced again in 2010 by former singer Dean Davidson, without the previous agreement of the other band members.

On September 3rd 2022, it was announced that Johnny Dee is the new drummer for Tyketto, following the departure of long time sticksman Michael Clayton.

Equipment
Johnny Dee plays DW drums and Paiste cymbals, using Vater Percussion drumsticks and Evans drumheads.

Discography

With World War III
 World War III (1985)

With Waysted 
 Save Your Prayers (1986)
 Wilderness of Mirrors (2000)

With Britny Fox 
Studio albums
 Britny Fox (1988)
 Boys in Heat (1989)
 Bite Down Hard (1991)
 Springhead Motorshark (2003)

Live albums
 Gudbuy T'Dean (1997 - unofficial)
 Long Way to Live! (2001)
 Live at Froggy's (2001)
 Extended Versions (2006)

Compilations
 The Best of Britny Fox (2001)
 The Bite Down Hard Demo Sessions (2002)

With Mariah
 Somewhere Between Heaven and Earth (1991)
 III (2007)

With Uncle Edna
 Uncle Edna (1996)

With Doro 
Studio albums
 Machine II Machine (1995)
 Fight (2002)
 Classic Diamonds (2004)
 Warrior Soul (2006)
 Fear No Evil (2009)
 Raise Your Fist (2012)
 Forever Warriors / Forever United (2018)

Live albums
 Doro Live (1993)
25 Years in Rock... and Still Going Strong (2010)

Other appearances 
Jack Frost  - Raise Your Fist to Metal (2003)
 Jim Stevens - "Connective Energies" (2017) appears on 8 songs

References

External links 
Official site of Doro Pesch
Mariah su MySpace

American heavy metal drummers
1963 births
Living people
People from Conshohocken, Pennsylvania
American people of Italian descent
Doro (musician)
20th-century American drummers
American male drummers
Britny Fox members
Waysted members